County of Fergusson is a cadastral unit located in the Australian state of South Australia which spans Yorke Peninsula south of Price.  It was proclaimed in 1869 by Governor Fergusson after whom the county was named.

Description 
The County of Fergusson covers the part of Yorke Peninsula "lying to the south of the south boundary of the County of Daly, including Wauraltee Island", the county boundary approximately aligning with Price town centre.

History
The County of Fergusson was proclaimed by Sir James Fergusson, the eighth Governor of South Australia on 18 February 1869 along with three of its constituent hundreds, Melville, Moorowie and Para Wurlie. The county was named after Governor Fergusson, who held office from 1869 to 1873.

Sixteen hundreds were proclaimed within the county from 1869 to 1878: Carribie and Coonarie in 1878, Cunningham in 1873, Curramulka in 1874, Dalrymple and Kilkerran in 1872, Koolywurtie in 1874, Maitland in 1872, Melville in 1869, Minlacowie in 1874, Moorowie in 1869, Muloowurtie in 1874, Para Wurlie in 1869, Ramsay in 1872, Warrenben in 1878 and Wauraltee in 1874.

The earliest local government bodies established within the county were the District Council of Melville, formed in 1875 and comprising the Hundred of Melville and part of the Hundred of Moorowie, the Corporate Town of Yorketown which seceded from Melville in 1879, the Corporate Town of Edithburgh which seceded from the same in 1882, the Corporate Town of Maitland, formed in 1883 within the Hundred of Maitland, and the District Council of Dalrymple, formed in 1877 and comprising the Hundred of Dalrymple.

Until 1888 the remaining residents of Yorke Peninsula, scattered across 14 hundred divisions, strongly resisted the establishment of local government. This allowed them to escape being subject to the expense of council rates until 1888 when the promulgation of the District Councils Act 1887 forced the incorporation of the entire peninsula into district councils. Thus, from January 1888:
 The hundreds of Cunningham, Kilkerran, Wauraltee and Muloowurtie were incorporated as the new District Council of Yorke Peninsula, along with a previously unincorporated portion of the Hundred of Maitland; 
 The hundreds of Curramulka, Koolywurtie and Minlacowie were incorporated as the new District Council of Minlaton, along with a previously unincorporated portion of the Hundred of Ramsay; and
 The hundreds of Carribie, Coonarie, Para Wurlie and Warrenben were incorporated into the District Council of Melville along with a previously unincorporated portion of the Hundred of Moorowie.

List of constituent hundreds

Description of layout of the hundreds
The hundreds located within the County of Fergusson are laid out as follows:  
West coast of the peninsula overlooking Spencer Gulf (from south to north) - Warrenben, Carribie, Para Wurlie, northern end of Moorowie, Minlacowie, Koolywurtie, Wauraltee and Kilkerran.
South  coast of the peninsula overlooking Investigator Strait (from west to east) - Warrenben, Coonarie, Moorowie and Melville.
East coast overlooking Gulf St Vincent (from south to north) - Melville, Dalrymple, Ramsay, Curramulka, Muloowurtie and Cunningham.
Boundary with the County of Daly (from west to east) - Kilkerran, Maitland and Cunningham.

Hundred of Kilkerran
The Hundred of Kilkerran was proclaimed on 20 June 1872.

Localities include Balgowan, Point Pearce, South Kilkerran and part of the Maitland boundary.

Hundred of Maitland
The Hundred of Maitland was proclaimed on 20 June 1872.

Localities include most of the Maitland boundary including the township, Yorke Valley and the western area of Cunningham.

Hundred of Cunningham
The Hundred of Cunningham was proclaimed on 19 June 1873.  It covers an area of  around the Ardrossan and Price areas and its name is reported as being derived from Hastings Cunningham which was the founder of what is now Mount Gambier and “a friend of Governor Fergusson.” The first local government body within the hundred was the District Council of Yorke Peninsula.

The localities included are Ardrossan,  Cunningham (eastern part), Dowlingville, Petersville, Price, Winulta (southern part).

Hundred of Wauraltee
The Hundred of Wauraltee was proclaimed on 31 December 1878. The first local government body within the hundred was the District Council of Yorke Peninsula.

Localities include Port Victoria, Urania and Wauraltee.

Hundred of Muloowurtie
The Hundred of Muloowurtie was proclaimed on 31 December 1874.

The localities of Sandilands, James Well, Rogues Point, Pine Point and Black Point, and a northern section of Curramulka are within the hundred.

Hundred of Koolywurtie

Proclaimed in 1874 on central Yorke Peninsula and first governed at the local level by the District Council of Minlaton.

Hundred of Curramulka
The Hundred of Curramulka was proclaimed on 31 December 1874.

The localities of Curramulka, PortJulia, Sheoak Flat and part of the Port Vincent are within the hundred.

Hundred of Minlacowie
The Hundred of Minlacowie was proclaimed on 26 March 1874.

Localities include Minlaton, Brentwood, Parsons Beach and part of the Hardwicke Bay boundary.

Hundred of Ramsay
The Hundred of Ramsay was proclaimed on 20 June 1872. The first local government bodies within the hundred were the District Council of Minlaton and the District Council of Dalrymple.

Localities include Ramsay, Port Vincent and part of Stansbury

Hundred of Carribie 
The Hundred of Carribie was proclaimed on 24 January 1878.

Hundred of Para Wurlie
The Hundred of Para Wurlie was proclaimed on 18 February 1869. The first local government body within the hundred was the District Council of Melville.

Hundred of Moorowie
The Hundred of Moorowie was proclaimed on 18 February 1869.

Hundred of Dalrymple

Proclaimed in 1872 on the southern Yorke Peninsula and first governed at the local level by the District Council of Dalrymple.

Hundred of Melville

Proclaimed in 1869 at the south-eastern corner of Yorke Peninsula and first governed at the local level by the District Council of Melville, the Corporate Town of Yorketown and the Corporate Town of Edithburgh.

Hundred of Coonarie
The Hundred of Coonarie was proclaimed on 24 January 1878.

Hundred of Warrenben
The Hundred of Warrenben was proclaimed on 24 January 1878.

See also
Lands administrative divisions of South Australia

References

Counties of South Australia
Yorke Peninsula